GM Voices is a company and recording facility that specializes in voice prompts for IVR and automated phone applications, GPS, and telematics/remote diagnostics. Business presentation narration services are also offered. Currently, GM Voices provides recordings, translation, and language localization services in 100 languages and dialects.

GM Voices records prompt sets (replacement and custom recordings) for open source VoIP software like Asterisk and FreeSWITCH. GM Voices persona Callie is the official voice of FreeSWITCH.

In June 2005, the software company ScanSoft was looking for someone to be the voice for a database project involving speech construction. ScanSoft inquired with GM Voices and selected Susan Bennett, who happened to be present when the scheduled voice-over artist was absent.  Bennett was hired and the project recordings would eventually be used as the original voice of Apple's Siri.

On July 1, 2014, GM Voices became the official partner to source professional voice prompts for select Genesys Telecommunications Laboratories services including IVR.

They own an 18,000 sq foot facility with three studio control rooms, two sound booths, conference rooms and a selection of editing suites and offices where they accomplish most of their voice work.

Automated gate agent announcements for Delta Air Lines are prerecorded by GM Voices.

References

External links 
 GM Voices Home Page
 GM Voices Blog

Companies established in 1985
Telecommunications companies of the United States
1985 establishments in Georgia (U.S. state)